Negi may refer to:

 Negi, a Japanese variety of Allium fistulosum (Welsh onion)
 Negi (surname) (including a list of persons with the name)
 Negi (comedian), a Filipino comedian
 Negi Springfield, the protagonist of the manga "Negima! Magister Negi Magi"